Glendon Airport  is located  northeast of Glendon, Alberta, Canada.

References

External links
Page about this airport  on COPA's Places to Fly airport directory

Registered aerodromes in Alberta
Municipal District of Bonnyville No. 87